R/T is the performance marker used on Dodge/Chrysler automobiles since the 1960s (much like Chevrolet Super Sport). R/T stands for Road/Track. R/T models usually come with R/T badging and a combination of upgraded suspension, tires, brakes, and often more powerful engines. Many models have also come with monotone paint and stripes as well as aggressive body kits. In 2004 the Chrysler SRT Division (Chrysler Corp. SRT Vehicles) replaced R/T as the high performance auto group for Dodge vehicles, though the trim level is still in use on many current models with more powerful engines and cosmetic changes such as different rims and bumpers and grills and the R/T badge.

Current Vehicles

Previous Vehicles

Other vehicles using R/T properties

Concept vehicles using R/T properties

Engines Gallery

See also
 Chrysler Group SRT Vehicles
 Mercedes-AMG
 Chevrolet SS Vehicles
 BMW M Power

References

External links
 Official Dodge Website

Chrysler
Dodge
Muscle cars